The second season of Swedish Idol premiered in August 2005 and continued until its grand finale on 2 December, when 17-year-old Agnes Carlsson from Vänersborg was crowned winner. The series was the first to crown a female Idol and is to date the sole season to be won by either a public or judges' wildcard contestant. Of the over 120 Idol winners worldwide, Carlsson is one of only three who gained a place in the finals as a judges' wildcard.  The others are 2003 Canadian Idol winner Ryan Malcolm and 2007 Australian Idol winner Natalie Gauci.  Carlsson has since become the most successful recording artist in the show's history.

Auditions
Auditions were held in the Swedish cities of Stockholm, Gothenburg, Malmö, Piteå and Sundsvall during the spring of 2005.

Finalists
(ages stated at time of contest)

Live Show Details
Two out of eight semi-finalists made it to the live finals each day, based on public phone voting. An additional semi-finalist contestant who had not gained enough public votes was also chosen by the judges to advance to the finals.

Heat 1 (19 September 2005)

Notes
Jonah Hallberg and Cindy Lamréus advanced to the top 11 of the competition. The other 4 contestants were eliminated.
Jens Pääjärvi and Sarah Razzaq returned for a second chance at the top 11 in the Wildcard Round.

Heat 2 (20 September 2005)

Notes
Måns Zelmerlöw and Maria Albayrak advanced to the top 11 of the competition. The other 4 contestants were eliminated.
Marième Niang returned for a second chance at the top 11 in the Wildcard Round.

Heat 3 (21 September 2005)

Notes
Sibel Redzep and Ola Svensson advanced to the top 11 of the competition. The other 4 contestants were eliminated.
Hanna Nilsson and Johan Larsson returned for a second chance at the top 11 in the Wildcard Round.

Heat 4 (22 September 2005)

Notes
Sebastian Karlsson and Elina Nelson advanced to the top 11 of the competition. The other 4 contestants were eliminated.
Agnes Carlsson, Martina Braun Wolgast and James Gamba returned for a second chance at the top 11 in the Wildcard Round.

Wildcard round (23 September 2005)

Notes
The judges selected Agnes Carlsson to move on into the Top 11 of the competition, before the hosts revealed the Top 3 vote getters. Jens Pääjärvi and Marième Niang received the most votes, and completed the Top 11.

Live Show 1 (30 September 2005)
Theme: My Idol

Live Show 2 (7 October 2005)
Theme: The 80s

Live Show 3 (14 October 2005)
Theme: Swedish Hits

Live Show 4 (21 October 2005)
Theme: Pop

Live Show 5 (28 October 2005)
Theme: Disco

Live Show 6 (4 November 2005)
Theme: Big Band

Live Show 7 (11 November 2005)
Theme: Rock

Live Show 8 (18 November 2005)
Theme: Love Songs

Live Show 9: Semi-final (25 November 2005)
Theme: Judge's Choice

Live final (2 December 2005)

Elimination chart

Idol (Swedish TV series)
2005 in Swedish music
2005 Swedish television seasons